Roland Varga (born 23 January 1990) is a Hungarian professional footballer who plays as a forward for Liga I club Sepsi OSK.

Club career

Győr
Varga was born in Budapest, Hungary. On 19 January 2012, he signed a three and a half-year contract with the Hungarian League club Győr.

Ferencváros
On 15 January 2015, Varga joined Hungarian League club Ferencváros.

International career
Varga played for Hungary at the 2009 FIFA U-20 World Cup finals in Egypt.

On 22 May 2014, Varga played his first match in the Hungary national team, and he scored the second Hungarian goal against Denmark national football team in a friendly match at the Nagyerdei Stadion in Debrecen.

On 1 June 2021, Varga was included in the final 26-man squad to represent Hungary at the rescheduled UEFA Euro 2020 tournament.

Career statistics

Club

International stats

International goals

Scores and results list Hungary's goal tally first, score column indicates score after each Varga goal.

Honours
Győr
Nemzeti Bajnokság I: 2012–13
Magyar Kupa runner-up: 2012–13
Szuperkupa: 2013

Ferencváros
Nemzeti Bajnokság I: 2015–16, 2018–19, 2019–20, 2020–21
Magyar Kupa: 2014–15, 2015–16, 2016–17
Ligakupa: 2014–15
Szuperkupa: 2015, 2016

Hungary U20
 FIFA U-20 World Cup third place: 2009

References

External links
Profile at hlsz.hu

1990 births
Living people
Footballers from Budapest
Association football forwards
Association football wingers
Hungarian footballers
Hungary international footballers
Hungary under-21 international footballers
Hungary youth international footballers
Brescia Calcio players
Újpest FC players
Calcio Foggia 1920 players
Győri ETO FC players
Ferencvárosi TC footballers
MTK Budapest FC players
Al-Ittihad Kalba SC players
Bruk-Bet Termalica Nieciecza players
Sepsi OSK Sfântu Gheorghe players
Nemzeti Bajnokság I players
Serie B players
Serie C players
Liga I players
UAE Pro League players
UEFA Euro 2020 players
Hungarian expatriate footballers
Expatriate footballers in Italy
Expatriate footballers in the United Arab Emirates
Expatriate footballers in Poland
Expatriate footballers in Romania
Hungarian expatriate sportspeople in Italy
Hungarian expatriate sportspeople in the United Arab Emirates
Hungarian expatriate sportspeople in Poland
Hungarian expatriate sportspeople in Romania